Leones De Alma Rosa FC Is a football team based in Santo Domingo, Dominican Republic. Founded in 1990, the team participated in the last tournament of the First Division of the Dominican Republic.

External links
 Leones De Alma Rosa Lider Absoluto
 Balompiedominicano.com
 Leones De Alma Rosa A La Final Vs Bauger FC
 leones-de-alma-rosa-comandan-futbol-sd/elnacional.com.do

Football clubs in the Dominican Republic
1990 establishments in the Dominican Republic